ABAC or Abac may refer to:

 Àbac, a restaurant in Barcelona, Spain
 Abraham Baldwin Agricultural College, a public college in Tifton, Georgia
 Anti-bribery/anti-corruption solutions, see Foreign Corrupt Practices Act#Anti-bribery/anti-corruption (ABAC) solutions
 Assumption University (Thailand), formerly known as Assumption Business Administration College
 Attribute-based access control